Dayton Township is the name of some places in the U.S. state of Michigan:

  Dayton Township, Newaygo County, Michigan
 Dayton Township, Tuscola County, Michigan

See also 
 Dayton Township (disambiguation)

Michigan township disambiguation pages